Soliloquy is a solo album by pianist Walter Bishop Jr. which was recorded in 1975 and released on the Seabreeze label.

Reception 

Scott Yanow of AllMusic stated "Walter Bishop, Jr.'s first (and thus far only) full set of unaccompanied piano solos sounds fine. ... although one often wishes that the bop-oriented pianist had been joined by bass and drums (which might have inspired him to play with more passion on this occasion). Worthwhile but not essential music".

Track listing 
 "Up Jumped Spring" (Freddie Hubbard) – 7:42
 "I Can't Get Started" (Vernon Duke, Ira Gershwin) – 5:36
 "A Day in the Life of a Fool" (Luiz Bonfá) – 5:15
 "I Got Rhythm" (George Gershwin, Ira Gershwin ) – 4:57
 "Here's That Rainy Day" (Jimmy Van Heusen, Johnny Burke) – 8:30
 "All the Things You Are" (Jerome Kern, Oscar Hammerstein II) – 5:27

Personnel 
Walter Bishop Jr. – piano

References 

Walter Bishop Jr. albums
1978 albums
Solo piano jazz albums